Richlind of Altdorf (c.990- 12 June 1045) was a German noblewoman and a member of the Swabian line of the Elder House of Welf.

Life
Richlind was the daughter of Rudolf II, Count of Altdorf and Ita (or Ida), daughter of Conrad I, Duke of Swabia. She was married to Adalbert II, count of Ebersberg. The couple had no children.

When Richlind’s husband, Adalbert, was dying (in March 1045) he made a donation to the monastery of Ebersberg and left his remaining property to his wife. Richlind enlisted the help of Emperor Henry III, to transfer this property to her nephew, Welf III, the son of her brother, Welf II.

Richlind died on 12 June 1045, when a building in which she was standing collapsed.

References
B. Schneidmüller, Die Welfen. Herrschaft und Erinnerung (819–1252). (Stuttgart, 2000)
H. Dopsch, ‘Welf III und Kärnten’ in D. Bauer, et al., eds., Welf IV. - Schlüsselfigur einer Wendezeit: Regionale und europäische Perspektiven (Munich, 2004), pp. 84–128.

External links
Medieval Lands Project: Swabia
Richlind von Altdorf (in German)

Notes

House of Welf
11th-century German nobility
Elder House of Welf
11th-century German women
German countesses
1045 deaths
Swabian nobility